Ghorbani is an Iranian surname. Notable people with the surname include:

 Ali Ghorbani (footballer, born 1979), Iranian footballer
 Ali Ghorbani (footballer, born 1990), Iranian footballer
 Mehdi Ghorbani (born 1988), Iranian boxer
 Pirouz Ghorbani (born 1978), Iranian footballer
 Alireza Ghorbani (born 1972), Iranian traditional vocalist
 Babak Ghorbani (1989–2014), Iranian wrestler
 Mohammad Ghorbani (wrestler) (born 1943), retired Iranian flyweight freestyle wrestler
 Omid Ghorbani (born 1993), Iranian footballer
 Shireen Ghorbani, American politician from Utah
 Ali Ghorbani (disambiguation)
 Ali Mohammad Ghorbani, Iranian reformist
 Mahmoud Ghorbani
 Mousa Ghorbani

Iranian-language surnames
Lisa Ghorbani